Serra da Capivara National Park (Portuguese: Parque Nacional Serra da Capivara, locally ) is a national park in the Northeastern region of Brazil. The area has many prehistoric paintings.

The name of the mountain range that defines the park, "Serra da Capivara," literally means "Capybara Hills" in Portuguese. This area has the largest and the oldest concentration of prehistoric sites in the Americas. Scientific studies confirm that the Capivara mountain range was densely populated in the pre-Columbian Era.

Location
It is located in northeast state of Piauí, between latitudes 8° 26' 50" and 8° 54' 23" south and longitudes 42° 19' 47" and 42° 45' 51" west. It falls within the municipal areas of São Raimundo Nonato, São João do Piauí, Coronel José Dias and Canto do Buriti. It has an area of 1291.4 square kilometres (319,000 acres).

The Capivara-Confusões Ecological Corridor, created in 2006, links the park to the Serra das Confusões National Park.

History

The park was created to protect the prehistoric artifacts and paintings found there. It became a World Heritage Site in 1991. Its head archaeologist is Niède Guidon. Its best known archaeological site is Pedra Furada.

Scientific studies confirm that the Capivara mountain range was densely populated in the pre-Columbian Era.
A newer site is Toca da Tira Peia, where the stone tools found may date to as early as 22,000 years ago. The site has been dated through optically stimulated luminescence.

Other important archaeological sites in the area are Toca da Pena, Baxao da Esperanca, and Sitio do Meio. Lapa do Boquete site is located directly south.

Sítio do Meio
Sítio do Meio is the second most important rock shelter in the area after Pedra Furada. It features fully Pleistocene dates and artefacts. The stone artefacts are better preserved because of the absence of waterfalls here. At least 98 stone tools seem older than 12,500 BP. They belong to the Upper Pleistocenic phase of Pedra Furada 3.

See also
 Niède Guidon
Cavernas do Peruaçu Environmental Protection Area
Museum of Archeology and Ethnology of the University of São Paulo

References

Bibliography
Eric Boëda, et al. (2014), Les Industries pléistocènes du Piaui. Nouvelles données academia.edu

External links

Explore Serra da Capivara National Park in the UNESCO collection on Google Arts and Culture
The Rock Art of Serra da Capivara
Brazilian Ministry of External Relations information about park
Photos of Serra da Capivara by Maria-Brazil
FUMDHAM - South-American Pre-Historic Men Foundation

Archaeological sites in Brazil
World Heritage Sites in Brazil
National parks of Brazil
Oldest human remains in the Americas
Protected areas of Piauí
Pre-Clovis archaeological sites in the Americas
Caatinga